The 2004–05 season was the 96th year of football played by Dundee United, and covers the period from 1 July 2004 to 30 June 2005. United finished in ninth place which meant the previous season's top-six finish was the only one in the five seasons since the split was introduced.

United finished the 2004–05 SPL season in 9th place with 36 points, in which an eventful final day could have relegated themselves, Livingston or Dunfermline, before eventually consigning Dundee to the drop. United managed only eight wins, with twelve draws and eighteen defeats. Between March and early-April, United lost five consecutive games, although most were to teams who would finish in the top half of the league.

The cup campaigns brought contrasting fortunes. a 7–1 defeat to Rangers in the League Cup semi-final was remedied by a fighting display against Celtic in the Scottish Cup final, where United lost 1–0. Despite having fewer chances, United had more possession and it took a deflected free-kick to give Celtic the win. Defender Alan Archibald struck the bar in the final minute as United pushed for an equaliser.

A strong league finish secured United's top-flight status, with four wins from the final seven games, including victories against Rangers, Hearts and rivals Dundee.

Season review
United began pre-season with James Grady as the only pre-season signing, the striker arriving on a Bosman transfer from relegated Partick Thistle. First-team regulars Paul Gallacher and Charlie Miller left by the same method during the summer, with Scotland keeper Gallacher heading for Norwich City and Miller joining Norwegian side SK Brann. Veteran Owen Coyle also cut short his second Tannadice stay to return to Airdrie Utd. During August, Paul Ritchie and goalkeeper Lars Hirschfeld arrived on six-month deals following releases from Walsall and Tottenham respectively. Surprisingly, Grant Brebner was also allowed to sign for free from fellow SPL side Hibernian.

A home defeat to derby rivals Dundee just two games in was not the ideal way to start the season and United managed only one win in August, with a 2–1 home victory over Inverness CT. During August, youngsters Aaron Conway and Karim Kerkar arrived from Clyde in early-September but the month brought little to cheer about, with a CIS Insurance Cup win over Clyde providing the only win.

Into October and the winless streak continued, although a last-minute draw at Rangers brought some optimism. Another derby defeat in early November was tempered firstly by a CIS Cup quarter-final win over Hibs, then a home league success over Livingston but more defeats followed and only one more win arrived before Christmas, courtesy of a 3–0 triumph at home to Kilmarnock.

United entered New Year with no away wins but finally won on the road, thanks to a 4–3 thriller at Gretna in the Scottish Cup. The third derby match was drawn 2–2 with Steve Lovell's late leveller denying United three points, in a game where Nick Colgan – signed 24 hours previously – was given a debut. February started in dismal fashion, with Colgan's second (and final) match resulting in a 7–1 defeat against Rangers in the CIS Cup semi-final. In a match screened live on BBC Scotland, United rallied from 2–0 down with Jason Scotland scoring, and had Jim McIntyre's long-range strike not hit both posts and ran along the line at 2–1 down, the game might have been different. United did recover by winning three of the remaining four matches that month, albeit two in the Scottish Cup. Queen of the South were beaten first, followed by a first away league win at Livingston and then a 4–1 home rout of Aberdeen in the quarter-final. With the match shown live on Sky Sports, it was a chance for United to gain television revenge for the Hampden horror show just three weeks previously.

Aberdeen were back at Tannadice three days later for a league match and won 2–1, starting a run of four straight defeats in March. After Kilmarnock's 3–0 victory, United lay bottom and Ian McCall was sacked, with Assistant Gordon Chisholm handed temporary control. Chisholm's first match was a live television affair at home to Celtic and only a Craig Bellamy hat-trick denied United a point, who equalised twice only to lose 3–2.

United went into April with a league/cup double-header against Hibs and lost the league match 3–2 at Easter Road to another late goal. The cup semi-final brought cheer, as Jason Scotland's winner ensured a final appearance in May, along with European football. The buzz from the win carried on, with successive impressive league victories at Rangers and at home to Hearts. A home draw to Livingston brought a blip but a 2–1 derby win at Dens Park closed the month in style, with caretaker-manager Gordon Chisholm winning the Manager of the Month award in his first full month in charge.

Into May and a lack of wins scared United fans, with only a home draw against Kilmarnock and a last-minute defeat to Dunfermline. This left United going into final game at Inverness as one of four clubs who could be relegated, along with Livingston, Dunfermline and Dundee. Dundee's early goal against Livingston moved them out of bottom spot, only for ex-United player Craig Easton to equalise. With no further goals and Barry Robson's penalty winner in Inverness, United survived, finishing in 9th place.

The Cup Final was a tense occasion, with Martin O'Neill's last match in charge bringing an edge to the 50,635 crowd. Alan Thompson's 9th-minute deflected free-kick ultimately won it for Celtic, with Chris Sutton missing a late penalty before Alan Archibald's injury-time drive nearly securing extra-time.

Match results
Dundee United played a total of 47 competitive matches during the 2004–05 season, as well as six pre-season friendlies, making a total of over fifty games played. The team finished ninth in the Scottish Premier League.

In the cup competitions, United were runners-up in the Tennent's Scottish Cup, losing 1–0 to Celtic, qualifying for the UEFA Cup in the process. The club lost heavily in the CIS Insurance Cup semi-finals, losing 7–1 to Rangers as Nick Colgan – playing only his second match in his loan spell – played his last game for the club.

Legend

All results are written with Dundee United's score first.

Bank of Scotland Premierleague

Tennent's Scottish Cup

CIS Insurance Cup

Player details
During the 2004–05 season, United used 26 different players comprising five nationalities, with a further six named as unused substitutes. The table below shows the number of appearances and goals scored by each player.

|}

Goalscorers
United had 13 players score with the team scoring 41 goals in total. The top goalscorer was Jim McIntyre, who finished the season with fifteen goals.

Discipline
During the 2004–05 season, three United players were sent off, and 17 players received at least one yellow card. In total, the team received three dismissals and 78 cautions.

Team statistics

League table

Transfers

In
The club signed four players during the season, as well as loaning one for the latter part. Only one player – Stevie Crawford – was signed for a fee (£80k).

Loans in

Out
Seven players were released by the club during the season. Four players were also loaned with Andy McLaren going on loan twice to different clubs.

Loans out

Playing kit

The jerseys were sponsored by Morning, Noon and Night for a second season.

Awards
 Gordon Chisholm
 Bank of Scotland Premierleague Manager of the Month: 1
 April 2005

Trivia
 Defender Alan Archibald played every minute of the 2004–05 season.
 United used different goalkeepers for all four CIS Insurance Cup matches:
 Tony Bullock played in the 3–1 second round win against Stranraer
 Lars Hirschfeld played in the 4–0 third round win against Clyde
 Paul Jarvie played in the 2–1 quarter-final win against Hibernian
 Nick Colgan played in the 7–1 semi-final defeat to Rangers.

References

External links
 Official site: 2004/05 Results
 Soccerbase: Results | Squad stats | Transfers

Dundee United F.C. seasons
Dundee United